Tomáš Plekanec (born 31 October 1982) is a Czech professional ice hockey centre currently playing for Rytíři Kladno of the Czech Extraliga (ELH). He has played most of his professional career for the Montreal Canadiens of the National Hockey League (NHL), but also briefly played for the Toronto Maple Leafs.

After beginning his career with HC Kladno, he was selected 71st overall by the Canadiens in the 2001 NHL Entry Draft. Moving to North America in 2002, he played three seasons for the Canadiens' American Hockey League (AHL) affiliate, the Hamilton Bulldogs, before joining the NHL club full-time for the 2005–06 season. By the time of his retirement from the NHL, he had played over 1,000 NHL games and is seventh all-time in games played for the Canadiens.

During his NHL career, Plekanec was known for his use of a turtleneck undershirt.

Playing career

Junior
Plekanec played junior ice hockey in his native Czech Republic with the HC Kladno organization. He debuted with club's senior team in 1998–99, appearing in three Czech Extraliga games.

Professional
Two years later, he joined the senior team full-time, recording 42 points over 53 games. In the off-season, Plekanec was selected by the Montreal Canadiens 71st overall in the third round of the 2001 NHL Entry Draft. Remaining in the Czech Extraliga for a second full season, he scored 30 points over 43 games in 2001–02.

Plekanec came to North America to begin playing in the Canadiens' system in 2002–03. Assigned to the club's minor league affiliate, the Hamilton Bulldogs of the AHL, he recorded 46 points over 77 games. Improving to 66 points with Hamilton in 2003–04, he also made his NHL debut that season, playing in two games. Due to the 2004–05 NHL lockout, Plekanec remained in Hamilton for a third AHL season and recorded 64 points over 80 games.

In 2005–06, Plekanec became a fixture in the Canadiens' lineup, scoring 29 points in his NHL rookie season. He improved to 47 points the next season in 2006–07 and notched his first 20-goal effort. On 29 February 2008, Plekanec recorded his first NHL hat-trick in a 6–2 victory over the Buffalo Sabres. He completed the 2007–08 season with 29 goals and 69 points. Plekanec received a two-game suspension on 12 February 2009, for a slewfoot on Edmonton Oilers defenceman Denis Grebeshkov during a game the previous day. Grebeshkov suffered a high ankle sprain on the play. He finished with a decreased 39 points in 2008–09, but still managed to notch 20 goals.

In the summer of 2009, he re-signed with the Canadiens to a one-year, $2.75 million contract. That season, he recorded a career-high 45 assists and 70 points. Set to become a free agent, he re-signed once more with the Canadiens on 22 June 2010, agreeing to a six-year, $30 million contract. He scored 22 goals during the 2010–11 season.

Plekanec signed with Kladno during the 2012–13 NHL lockout.

On 15 September 2014, Plekanec was named an alternate captain of the Canadiens, along with P. K. Subban, Max Pacioretty and Andrei Markov.

On 16 October 2015, Plekanec and the Canadiens agreed to a two-year, $12 million contract extension, signing him through until the end of the 2017–18 season.

The Canadiens struggled during the 2017–18 season, as they spent much of the year near the bottom of league standings. As the trade deadline approached, rumours concerning a trade involving Plekanec began to circulate. He was held out of the lineup on 24 February (two days before the trade deadline) as a potential trade loomed. The following day, Plekanec (in the final year of his contract), was traded to the Toronto Maple Leafs, along with minor league player Kyle Baun in exchange for Kerby Rychel, Rinat Valiev and a second-round pick in 2018. During the opening round of the playoffs against the Boston Bruins, following a three-game suspension to Nazem Kadri, Plekanec was placed on a line with Patrick Marleau and Mitch Marner. He scored two goals and four points in seven games, as the Maple Leafs were eliminated by the Bruins.

On 1 July 2018, Plekanec returned to the Canadiens, signing a one-year, $2.25 million contract. On 15 October 2018, Plekanec played in his 1,000th regular season NHL game, where he scored his first goal of the season.

On 9 November 2018, the Canadiens announced that they would be placing Plekanec on unconditional waivers for the purpose of terminating his contract. The termination was a mutual decision, as Plekanec announced his retirement from the NHL on the same day.

On 26 November 2018, Plekanec signed with Kometa Brno of the Czech Extraliga (ELH) and will additionally play for HC Kladno of the 1st Czech Republic Hockey League.

International play

Plekanec played in three junior international tournaments with the Czech Republic. He was named to the under-18 team at the 2000 IIHF World U18 Championships, where he contributed two points in six games. He then helped the Czechs to a gold medal at the 2001 World Junior Championships with two points in seven games. He made his second consecutive World Junior appearance in 2002 and improved to seven points in seven games.

After his first NHL season, Plekanec competed in the 2006 World Championships, where the Czech Republic captured a silver medal in Latvia. Plekanec scored the Czechs' first goal in the semi-final, helping the team defeat Finland 3–1. He went on to make his second and third consecutive World Championships appearances in 2007 and 2008. He was a member of the bronze-medal Czech team in the 2011 World Championships.

On 31 December 2009, Plekanec was named to the Czech team for the 2010 Winter Olympics in Vancouver. He recorded three points in five games as the Czech Republic were defeated in the quarter-final by Finland. He has also competed for the Czech national inline hockey team.

On 6 January 2014, Plekanec was named captain of the Czech Republic team competing in the 2014 Winter Olympics.

Personal life
In 2019, Plekanec and Czech singer/actress Lucie Vondráčková divorced after seven years of marriage. Plekanec was granted the right to take his Canadian-born sons Matyáš and Adam to the Czech Republic rather than stay in Montreal as Vondráčková requested.

Plekanec has been in a relationship with professional tennis player Lucie Šafářová since August 2018, and on July 4, 2019, Safarova announced on her Instagram account that they are expecting their first child. Šafářová gave birth to their daughter Lea in December 2019. In September 2021, Plekanec and Šafářová married.

Career statistics

Regular season and playoffs

International

See also
 List of NHL players with 1,000 games played

References

External links
 

1982 births
Living people
Czech expatriate ice hockey players in Canada
Czech ice hockey centres
Hamilton Bulldogs (AHL) players
Rytíři Kladno players
HC Kometa Brno players
Ice hockey players at the 2010 Winter Olympics
Ice hockey players at the 2014 Winter Olympics
Montreal Canadiens draft picks
Montreal Canadiens players
Olympic ice hockey players of the Czech Republic
Sportspeople from Kladno
Toronto Maple Leafs players